Mus is a subgenus of the rodent genus Mus.

Species
Little Indian field mouse, Mus booduga (Pakistan, India, Sri Lanka, Bangladesh, southern Nepal, central Myanmar)
Ryukyu mouse, Mus caroli (Ryukyu islands, Taiwan and southern China to Thailand; introduced in Malaysia and western Indonesia)
Fawn-colored mouse, Mus cervicolor (Northern India to Vietnam; introduced to Sumatra and Java)
Cook's mouse, Mus cookii (Southern and northeastern India and Nepal to Vietnam)
Cypriot mouse, Mus cypriacus (Cyprus)
Servant mouse, Mus famulus (Southwestern India)
Sheath-tailed mouse, Mus fragilicauda (Thailand and Laos)
Macedonian mouse, Mus macedonicus (Balkans to Israel and Iran)
House mouse, Mus musculus (introduced worldwide)
Mus nitidulus  (Central Myanmar)
Steppe mouse, Mus spicilegus (Austria to southern Ukraine and Greece)
Algerian mouse, Mus spretus (Southern France, Iberian Peninsula, Balearic Islands, Morocco to Tunisia)
Earth-colored mouse, Mus terricolor (India, Nepal, Bangladesh, Pakistan; introduced to Sumatra)

Phylogeny
The following phylogeny of Mus is from Barbara Lundrigan and colleagues' 2002 paper in Systematic Biology.

References

Animal subgenera